Oculogyric crisis (OGC) is the name of a dystonic reaction to certain drugs or medical conditions characterized by a prolonged involuntary upward deviation of the eyes. The term "oculogyric" refers to the bilateral elevation of the visual gaze, but several other responses are associated with the crisis.
Epilepsy can manifest as oculogyric seizures, also called versive seizures.

Signs and symptoms
Initial symptoms include restlessness, agitation, malaise, or a fixed stare.  Then comes the more characteristically described extreme and sustained upward deviation of the eyes.  In addition, the eyes may converge, deviate upward and laterally, or deviate downward.  The most frequently reported associated findings are backwards and lateral flexion of the neck, widely opened mouth, tongue protrusion, and ocular pain.  However, the condition may also be associated with intensely painful jaw spasms which may result in the breaking of a tooth.  A wave of exhaustion may follow an episode.  The abrupt termination of the psychiatric symptoms at the conclusion of the crisis is most striking.

Other features that are noted during attacks include mutism, palilalia, eye blinking, lacrimation, pupil dilation, drooling, respiratory dyskinesia, increased blood pressure and heart rate, facial flushing, headache, vertigo, anxiety, agitation, compulsive thinking, paranoia, depression, recurrent fixed ideas, depersonalization, violence, and obscene language.

In addition to the acute presentation, oculogyric crisis can develop as a recurrent syndrome, triggered by stress and by exposure to the drugs mentioned below.

Causes
Drugs that can trigger an oculogyric crisis include neuroleptics (such as haloperidol, chlorpromazine, fluphenazine, olanzapine), carbamazepine, chloroquine, cisplatin, diazoxide, levodopa, lithium, metoclopramide, lurasidone, domperidone, nifedipine, pemoline, phencyclidine ("PCP"), reserpine, and cetirizine, an antihistamine.  High-potency neuroleptics are the most common cause.

Other causes can include aromatic L-amino acid decarboxylase deficiency, postencephalitic Parkinson's, Tourette's syndrome, multiple sclerosis, neurosyphilis, head trauma, bilateral thalamic infarction, lesions of the fourth ventricle, cystic glioma of the third ventricle, herpes encephalitis, kernicterus and juvenile Parkinson's disease.

Patients with procyclidine addiction or craving may simulate signs of EPS to receive procyclidine.

Diagnosis

The diagnosis of oculogyric crisis is largely clinical and involves taking a focused history and physical examination to identify possible triggers for the crisis and rule out other causes of abnormal ocular movements.

Treatment
Immediate treatment of drug-induced OGC can be achieved with intravenous antimuscarinic benzatropine or procyclidine; these are usually effective within 5 minutes, although they may take as long as 30 minutes for full effect. Further doses of procyclidine may be needed after 20 minutes. Any causative new medication should be discontinued. The condition may also be treated with 25 mg diphenhydramine.

References

External links 

Neurological disorders
Symptoms and signs: Nervous and musculoskeletal systems